Data efficiency refers to efficiency of the many processes that can be applied to data such as storage, access, filtering, sharing, etc., and whether or not the processes lead to the desired outcome within resource constraints.

A management definition of data efficiency would be the measure of how data storage and usage across an enterprise or within a department or within a project - impacts the organization's costs and revenues.

On the broadest level:

DE = expected benefits from applying I.T. to a given task / cost of application of I.T.

On the technical side, in the development of computer hardware, software and systems, Data Efficiency can refer to many things such as packing bits on a physical medium1, or chip area usage on a silicon wafer2, or the use of data in programming so as to require less time and computation resources3.

Examples of these two categories of use for data efficiency (managerial and technical) can be found in process industries and computer chip research and development:

1.Traditional water/wastewater management procedures include travel to pump stations, reading and hand recording of meter numbers, transposition of log sheets, and other manual operations. This whole process can be said to have low data efficiency4.

2.In the design of today’s Dynamic Random Access Memory (DRAM) computer chips, R&D optimizes parameters such as row and column access times, chip area usage, burst length and row granularity. Input/output times are measured in very small fractions of a second. The latest versions of these chips are said to have high data efficiency2.

Both these examples above show the application of different information technologies that process data to reach a defined outcome. Sometimes processes are within time, space and resource constraints, and sometimes they are not.

References
 Takashi Ishida, “High density phase-change type optical disk having a data efficiency of more than 80 percent” US Patent for Matsushita Electric Industrial Co. Ltd.. Issued October 12, 2004. http://www.patentgenius.com/patent/6804190.html
 Frederick A. Ware and Craig Hampel. “Improving Power and Data Efficiency with Threaded Memory Modules” ICCD Proceedings 2006 Oct 4, 2006 Austin, TX. http://www.iccd-conference.org/proceedings/2006/paper_133.pdf
 Bob Steigerwald, Rajshree Chabukswar, Karthik Krishnan, Jun De Vega: “Creating Energy-Efficient Software” Intel’s online journal: Software Community Published On: Thursday, September 13, 2007. https://web.archive.org/web/20080110211002/http://softwarecommunity.intel.com/articles/eng/1462.htm#dataefficiency.
 Keith Frazier “Data Efficiency” whitepaper for water wastewater industry. http://birdnest.com/assets/files/Data%20Efficiency.pdf

Computer data